Slantsy is the name of several inhabited localities in Russia.

Urban localities
Slantsy, Leningrad Oblast, a town in Slantsevsky District of Leningrad Oblast; incorporated as Slantsevskoye Settlement Municipal Formation

Rural localities
Slantsy, Saratov Oblast, a selo in Rtishchevsky District of Saratov Oblast